Alex Preston (born 1979) is an English author and journalist.

Early life and education
Preston was born on 18 January 1979, in the seaside town of Worthing in West Sussex.

He attended Sompting Abbotts Preparatory School and then received a scholarship to Lancing College independent boarding school.

Preston graduated from Hertford College, Oxford and went on to receive his PhD in English Literature from University College London.

Career
Preston was working as an investment banker in the early 2000s when the banking market collapsed and he turned to teaching and writing.

Preston's first novel, This Bleeding City, was published by Faber and Faber in March 2010. The novel won the Spear's Best First Novel Prize, the Edinburgh International Book Festival Readers' First Book Award, and was chosen as one of Waterstone's New Voices 2010. It has been translated into twelve languages.

His second novel, The Revelations, was published in February 2012, while his third, In Love and War, was featured on BBC Radio 4's Book at Bedtime.

He is also the co-author of As Kingfishers Catch Fire, a memoir and anthology of literature about British birds.

Preston reviews books for a number of national newspapers and magazines and was a regular panelist on BBC2's The Review Show. He is an English lecturer at the University of Kent.

Personal life
Alex Preston is the brother of Samuel Preston, the former singer of The Ordinary Boys and Celebrity Big Brother contestant. He is the grandson of Princeton University English professor and literary critic Samuel Hynes.

Preston plays cricket for the Authors Cricket Club and contributed a chapter to the team's book The Authors XI: A Season of English Cricket from Hackney to Hambledon. He became notable as player-umpire for asking of fellow novelist Richard Beard, "Do you think you were out?" in response to a bellowed LBW appeal. For this he received the "Decision of the Season" award at their annual dinner.

He lives in Kent, England with his wife and two children.

References 

1979 births
Alumni of Hertford College, Oxford
English writers
English male journalists
Living people
People educated at Lancing College
21st-century British writers
21st-century English male writers